Ke-mo sah-bee (often spelled kemo sabe, kemosabe or kimosabe) is the term used by the fictional Native American sidekick Tonto as the "Native American" name for the Lone Ranger in the American television and radio programs The Lone Ranger.

Meaning and origin
Jim Jewell, director of The Lone Ranger from 1933 to 1939, took the phrase from Kamp Kee-Mo Sah-Bee, a boys' camp on Mullett Lake in Michigan, established by Charles W. Yeager (Jewell's father-in-law) in 1916. Yeager himself probably took the term from Ernest Thompson Seton, one of the founders of the Boy Scouts of America, who had given the meaning "scout runner" to Kee-mo-sah'-bee in his 1912 book The Book of Woodcraft and Indian Lore.

Kamp Kee-Mo Sah-Bee was in an area inhabited by the Ottawa, who speak a language that is mutually comprehensible with Ojibwe. John D. Nichols and Earl Nyholm's A Concise Dictionary of Minnesota Ojibwe defines the Ojibwe word  as 'he peeks' (and, in theory, 'he who peeks'), making use of the prefix , 'secretly'; Rob Malouf, now an associate professor of linguistics at San Diego State University, suggested that  may indeed have also meant scout (i.e., 'one who sneaks').

In media
Tonto has been represented by the following actors:

 John Todd in the 1933 radio show
 Chief Thundercloud in the movies from 1938 and forward
 Jay Silverheels in the 1950's TV series
 Michael Horse in the 1981 film The Legend of the Lone Ranger
 Johnny Depp in the 2013 movie

Other uses

Featured in the lyrics of "Apache (Jump on It)", a 1981 song by The Sugarhill Gang.
Featured in the lyrics of "If I Had a Boat" by Lyle Lovett, from his 1987 album Pontiac.
Featured in the lyrics of "The Lone Ranger", a 1976 UK hit single by Quantum Jump.
In the TV show MacGyver (1985–1992), it's a nickname for MacGyver used by his friend Jack Dalton.
The song "Kemosabe", a 2013 single by Manchester band Everything Everything from their album, Arc.
Kemosabe Records is an American record label founded by music producer Dr. Luke and is owned by Sony Music Entertainment.

References

Lone Ranger
Catchphrases
Quotations from radio
Quotations from television
1930s neologisms